Anton Horner (June 21, 1877 – December 4, 1971) was an American horn player. He was part of the Philadelphia Orchestra for 44 years and served and for 28 years its solo horn player. He is credited for introducing the double horn to the United States.

Biography
Horner was born in Gossengrün, Bohemia, part of Austria-Hungary (now Krajková in the Czech Republic) in 1877. He studied under Friedrich Gumpert at the Leipzig Conservatory. After coming to the United States, he joined the Pittsburgh Symphony led by Victor Herbert in 1899. He toured Europe in 1900 with the Sousa Band. He joined the Philadelphia Orchestra in 1902, and retired in 1946. He taught for many years at the Curtis Institute of Music. He died in Springfield, Pennsylvania, on December 4, 1971 at age 94. Upon his death, the Philadelphia Orchestra director Eugene Ormandy called Horner "one of the greatest horn players of all time”. Among his many accomplished pupils was Mason Jones.

References

1877 births
1971 deaths
People from Sokolov District
American people of German Bohemian descent
American horn players
Curtis Institute of Music faculty
University of Music and Theatre Leipzig alumni